The Murat Paşa Mosque is an Ottoman mosque in the Muratpaşa borough of Antalya, Turkey.

Architecture
It was commissioned by Murat Pasha of Karaman in 1570 and is covered with a high dome upon a ten-corner frame, with the inscriptions on its inner walls running all through the internal façade in a ribbon while presenting the most beautiful example of the Turkish-Seljuk art of calligraphy. The altar next to the marble pulpit worked with reliefs is a simple construction. The last congregation place is covered with three domes rising above pointed arches of coloured stone on four round columns.

See also
 List of mosques
 Ottoman architecture

References

External links
 Image of the Murat Paşa Mosque

16th-century mosques
Ottoman mosques in Antalya
Mosques in Antalya
Buildings and structures in Antalya
Tourist attractions in Antalya
Religious buildings and structures completed in 1570
Mosque buildings with domes